Edward Phillips (born 29 March 1998) is a former professional Australian rules footballer who played for the St Kilda Football Club in the Australian Football League (AFL). He was drafted by St Kilda with their third selection and 56th overall in the 2016 national draft.
In four years with the Saints, Phillips was unable to cement a permanent spot in the side. He was delisted at the end of the 2020 season.

References

External links

1998 births
Living people
St Kilda Football Club players
Oakleigh Chargers players
Box Hill Football Club players
Sandringham Football Club players
Australian rules footballers from Victoria (Australia)